The Montesano Farmers were a minor league baseball team based in Montesano, Washington in 1905 and 1910. The Montesano Farmers played as members of the 1905 Class D level Southwest Washington League and 1910 Washington State League, winning the 1905 Southwest Washington League championship. The Farmers hosted home minor league games at Vessey Memorial Ball Park.

History 
Minor league baseball began in Montesano, Washington in 1905. The Montesano "Farmers" became members of the four–team Class D level Southwest Washington League. Montesano joined the Aberdeen Pippins, Hoquiam Loggers and Olympia Senators in league play. The league played six times per week, but counted only weekend games for the standings.

In their first season of play, the Farmers won the Southwest Washington League championship. The Farmers placed 1st in the final standings with a 24–10 record, winning the title playing under manager Billy Campbell. The Farmers finished 5.0 games ahead of the 2nd place Olympia Senators, followed by Aberdeen and Hoquiam. Montesano did not return to the league in 1906.

The 1910 Montesano Farmers resumed minor league baseball play. The 1910 Montesano Farmers were charter members of the six–team Class D level Washington State League. The Aberdeen Black Cats, Chehalis Gophers, Hoquiam Loggers, Raymond Cougars and Tacoma Cubs joined Montesano as charter members in league play.

The Washington State League was reportedly organized in Hoquiam, Washington at a meeting held on March 6, 1910. The league was formed as a six–team league, playing a 21-week schedule. The franchises voted to split the shares of tickets equally between the home and away teams. Ten percent of the ticket earnings were to given to the league for travel expenses. At the initial meeting, Walter A. MacFarlane was elected league president and W.E. Campbell was elected vice president. During the 1910 season, the salary cap was set, with a limit of $850.00 per month.

Beginning play on May 10, 1910, the Montesano Farmers placed 4th in the Washington State League in their final season of play. The Farmers ended the season with a record of 22–31, playing under manager Chub Philbrick. The Farmers finished 13.0 games behind the 1st place Raymond Cougars. Raymond (36–19) was followed by the 2nd place Chehalis Gophers (35–19), Aberdeen Black Cats (24–29), Montesano Farmers (22–31) Hoquiam Loggers (12–18) and Tacoma Cubs (8–21) in the final standings. The 1911 Washington State League was reduced to four teams, with the Montesano franchise folding from the league.

Montesano, Washington has not hosted another minor league team.

The ballpark
The Montesano Farmers hosted home minor league home games at John W. Vessey Memorial Ball Park. Still in use today, is noted the ballpark likely was under a different name in the era. The ballpark is located at 900 Pioneer Avenue East in Montesano.

Timeline

Year–by–year records

Notable alumni
Charley Moore (1910)

See also
Montesano Farmers players

References

External links
 Baseball Reference

Defunct minor league baseball teams
Defunct baseball teams in Washington (state)
Baseball teams established in 1905
Baseball teams disestablished in 1905
Baseball teams established in 1910
Baseball teams disestablished in 1910
Washington State League teams
Grays Harbor County, Washington
1905 establishments in Washington (state)
1910 disestablishments in Washington (state)